Krausová is the Czech-language feminine form of the German-language surname Kraus. Notable people with the surname include:

 Anna Krausová
Jana Krausová
Lucie Krausová
Markéta Krausová (1895 - 1942),  Czech Jewish film and stage actress and opera singer

See also

Czech-language surnames
Surnames of German origin